The Alabama Historical Society in the state of Alabama, United States, formed in 1850 and was incorporated in 1852. Founders included James F. Sulzby, Alexander Bowie, Joshua H. Foster, E.D. King, Basil Manly Sr., Washington Moody, and Albert J. Pickett. It was based in Tuscaloosa. Activities ceased by 1905.

See also
 Alabama Department of Archives and History (est. 1901), government agency
 Alabama Historical Association (est. 1947)
 Alabama Historical Commission (est. 1966), government agency

References

Bibliography
 . 1852- . (Also here)
   1896 reprint

State historical societies of the United States
1850 establishments in Alabama
Organizations based in Alabama
History of Alabama
1905 disestablishments